The Traffickers is a 2016 British-American eight-part investigative television series about the illegal trafficking of goods including precious minerals, fake pharmaceuticals, guns, endangered species, and humans. It is produced by Lightbox, the production company founded by Simon Chinn, who won Oscars for the feature documentaries Man On Wire (2008) and Searching For Sugar Man (2012), and Jonathan Chinn, an Emmy Award winner for American High.  The Traffickers series, presented and narrated by Nelufar Hedayat, premiered on Fusion on 13 November 2016.

Episodes

Soundtrack 

The opening theme and original music score was composed by Tandis Jenhudson.

References

External links
 The Traffickers at  Fusion

2016 American television series debuts
2010s American documentary television series
2020s American documentary television series
Organ trade
Works about sex trafficking
Works about smuggling